Alfred Chester Todd (January 7, 1902 – March 8, 1985) was an American professional baseball player, manager and scout. He played as a catcher in Major League Baseball (MLB) from 1932 to 1943 for the Philadelphia Phillies, Pittsburgh Pirates, Brooklyn Dodgers and Chicago Cubs.

Baseball career
Todd was a native of Troy, New York. His professional playing career began at the advanced age of 26 in 1928 at the lowest level—then Class D—of minor league baseball. Todd led all National League catchers in games caught each year, batted .307 and .265 respectively, and drove home 86 and 75 runs batted in. 

During the 1938 offseason, Todd was traded to the Boston Bees, then to the Dodgers. In , he platooned with left-handed-hitting Babe Phelps and batted .278 for the Dodgers. He then finished his MLB playing tenure with the Cubs.

Career statistics
In an eleven-year major league career, Todd played in 863 games, accumulating 768 hits in 2,785 at bats for a .276 career batting average along with 35 home runs, 366 runs batted in and a .307 on-base percentage. He posted a .977 career fielding percentage.

Managing career
Todd worked as a minor league manager and scout for several years after his playing career ended. He died on March 8, 1985, at the age of 83 in Elmira, New York.

References

External links

1902 births
1985 deaths
Baseball players from New York (state)
Bloomington Cubs players
Brooklyn Dodgers players
Chicago Cubs players
Dallas Steers players
Elmira Pioneers players
Evansville Hubs players
Fort Smith Twins players
Hanover Raiders players
Los Angeles Angels (minor league) players
Major League Baseball catchers
Mansfield University of Pennsylvania alumni
Milwaukee Brewers (minor league) players
Minor league baseball managers
Mobile Bears players
Montreal Royals players
New York Yankees scouts
Philadelphia Phillies players
Pittsburgh Pirates players
Toronto Maple Leafs (International League) players